Tu'er Ye, also known as the Rabbit God, is a deity of Chinese folk religion unique to Beijing, where his sculptures are traditionally crafted. He is related with moon worship, as he is considered the moon rabbit of the goddess Chang'e. A frequent misnomer is "Tuye Er" (兔爺兒, "Rabbit God (as a) Youth").  Based on the correct Beijing dialect, it should be "Tu'er Ye" (兔兒爺).

In his traditional iconography, he rides a tiger, a dragon or a horse, but he is represented standing alone as well. The cult of the Rabbit God started in Beijing in 1906, later in the 20th century disappeared, and was resumed only in the late 2000s. He has a female counterpart, Tu'er Nainai.  However the two could be one and the same deity since in some legends, Tu'er Ye changed his appearance depending on what human clothing was donated to him by the people he helped.  So Tu'er Nainai could simply be a cross-dressing Tu'er Ye. He is not to be confused with Tu'er Shen, a different cult of perhaps the same deity.

See also
 Lunar deity
 Chang'e
 Tuershen

External links
 Lord Rabbit Worshipping Returns to Yuetan Park
 Jade Rabbit, Lord Rabbit

Chinese deities